The  Mona racer or Puerto Rican racer (Borikenophis variegatus) is a species of snake in the family Colubridae. The species is endemic to Puerto Rico.

References

.

Borikenophis
Reptiles of Puerto Rico
Reptiles described in 1926